Pterolophia lateripicta is a species of beetle in the family Cerambycidae. It was described by Léon Fairmaire in 1879, originally under the genus Oopsis. It is known from Fiji.

References

lateripicta
Beetles described in 1879